Clayton Covell Pervier (March 4, 1857 – November 19, 1929) was an American farmer, teacher, politician, and newspaper editor.

Biography
Pervier was born in Mineral Township, Bureau County, Illinois. He went to the Bureau County public schools and the University of Illinois. Pervier was a farmer and taught school. He lived in Sheffield, Illinois with his wife and family. Pervier was the associate editor for the Farmers Review and wrote about agricultural conditions in various countries in Europe for the Farmers Review. Pervier served on the Bureau County Board of Supervisors and was chairman of the county board. Pervier was a Republican. He served in the Illinois House of Representatives from 1907 to 1915 and then served in the Illinois Senate from 1915 to 1923. Pervier died from a heart attack at his home in Sheffield, Illinois.

References

External links

1857 births
1929 deaths
People from Bureau County, Illinois
University of Illinois alumni
Editors of Illinois newspapers
Educators from Illinois
Farmers from Illinois
County board members in Illinois
Republican Party members of the Illinois House of Representatives
Republican Party Illinois state senators